Sir David Alexander Fagan  (born 1961) is a New Zealand sheep shearer, who has won the New Zealand Golden Shears contest a record 16 times. 

From Te Kuiti, Fagan has set 10 world records, and won five world, six world team, and 16 national titles, making him New Zealand's most successful competition sheep shearer.

Honours
In 1990, Fagan was awarded the New Zealand 1990 Commemoration Medal. In the 1999 Queen's Birthday Honours, he was appointed a Member of the New Zealand Order of Merit, for services to shearing. He was promoted to Officer of the same order in the 2007 Queen’s Birthday Honours, and further promoted to Knight Companion of the New Zealand Order of Merit, also for services to shearing, in the 2016 New Year Honours.

References

1961 births
Living people
New Zealand sheep shearers
Knights Companion of the New Zealand Order of Merit
People from Te Kūiti